After the restoration of independence, economically, the years after the independence can be divided into two main periods in Azerbaijan. The period of 1991–1995 was characterized by economic chaos and regression. The period after 1996 is known for an increase in macroeconomic stability and dynamic economic development. Azerbaijan was upgraded by 18 points and ranked 51st among 133 countries and led the way among CIS countries in the World Economic Forum's (WEF) Global Competitiveness Report issued for 2009–2010. As stated in United Nations Conference on Trade and Development's (UNCTAD) report, Azerbaijan's direct investments abroad in 2016 totaled $533 million, significantly up from $232 million in 2010. 

Azerbaijan has bilateral investment treaties with the countries of Albania, Austria, Belarus, Belgium, Bulgaria, Czech Republic, China, Croatia, Egypt, Estonia, Finland, France, Georgia, Germany, Greece, Iran, Israel, Italy, Jordan, Kazakhstan, Korea, Kyrgyzstan, Latvia, Lithuania, Lebanon, Macedonia, Montenegro, Moldova, Norway, Pakistan, Poland, Qatar, Romania, Russia, Serbia, Saudi Arabia, Syria, Switzerland, Tajikistan, Turkey, UAE, Ukraine, the United Kingdom, and Uzbekistan.
Azerbaijan invested mostly in Turkey, Georgia, Russia, Uzbekistan, Ukraine, Romania, and Switzerland.

Azerbaijan as an investor in Europe and CIS countries 

In 2010, Azerbaijan entered into the top eight biggest oil suppliers to EU countries with €9.46 billion.

State Oil Fund of the Republic of Azerbaijan allocated 258 million euros in the construction of a resort in Montenegro. The project stipulates construction of the resort in the Boca Bay area, which is one of the nicest places on Montenegro's coast. An agreement on the long-term lease of the facility, which is located in a former military site, 116 kilometers (72 miles) southwest of Montenegro's capital Podgorica, will be signed with SOCAR for 90 years.

Among other foreign operations of SOCAR is investment in the energy industry of Switzerland. The company is also involved in the implementation of the Azerbaijan-Georgia-Romania Interconnector (AGRI) gas project in Romanian territory, and in developing the fuel infrastructure of Greece, Ukraine, and Moldova.

State Oil Fund of the Republic of Azerbaijan is interested in investing in the construction of oil refineries in Kyrgyzstan, Tajikistan, Georgia, Ukraine, and even in Latin America.

According to the report of Georgia's National Statistics Office (Geostat) Azerbaijan is Georgia's top investor in the third quarter of 2016, and the first and second quarters of the year as well.
Azerbaijan invested $151 million in Georgia's economy in Q3, 2016, which is 15.1 percent less than in the same period of 2015. In the Q3, 2016, Azerbaijan's investments amounted to 33 percent of all investments made in Georgia's economy. Overall, in the nine months of 2016 Azerbaijan invested $434 million in Georgia, which is 9.6 percent more than in the same period of 2015.
In total, $463 million was invested in Georgia's economy during the reporting period, which is 4.1 percent less than in Q3, 2015.

Azerbaijan as an investor in Turkey 
One of the biggest Azerbaijani companies investing abroad is the state oil company SOCAR. 
Azerbaijan aims to invest in projects implemented in all regional and European countries. But the country where it invests most of all is Turkey. By 2018, State Oil Fund of the Republic of Azerbaijan's investments in Turkey will reach $20 billion.
There are more than 800 companies in Turkey operating with Azerbaijani capital. These companies are mainly engaged in construction, tourism, real estate, energy, and transport sectors. The state oil company SOCAR and other Azerbaijani companies have invested about $4.5 billion in the Turkish economy.

Azerbaijan invests in non-oil sectors of the foreign countries` economy 
Azerbaijan invests in foreign countries` economy not only on account of its oil revenues. Many non-oil sectors of the economy try to make investments as well. For example, a five-star hotel will be built in neighboring Georgia with Azerbaijani investment. Construction of the "London" hotel was officially launched on 26 July. The new hotel will be built with investments of the Nakhchivan Autonomous Republic. The construction work is carried out by the Azerbaijani company Gemi Gaya. Azerbaijani investors have allocated $10 million for the construction of the hotel.

References

Further reading  
 United States Department of State
 Overview
 Made in Azerbaijan
 Export Solutions | International Trade Administration
 Impact of Post-Soviet Transition on the Economy of Azerbaijan
 Azerbaijan's economic priorities for 2017

Economy of Azerbaijan
Investment